Imre Csősz (born 31 May 1969, in Debrecen) is a Hungarian judoka. He competed at three Olympic Games.

Achievements

References

External links
 

1969 births
Living people
Hungarian male judoka
Judoka at the 1992 Summer Olympics
Judoka at the 1996 Summer Olympics
Judoka at the 2000 Summer Olympics
Olympic judoka of Hungary
Olympic bronze medalists for Hungary
Olympic medalists in judo
Medalists at the 1992 Summer Olympics
Sportspeople from Debrecen
20th-century Hungarian people
21st-century Hungarian people